The Peacemakers is an 1868 painting by George P.A. Healy.  It depicts the historic March 27, 1865, strategy session by the Union high command on the steamer River Queen during the final days of the American Civil War.  Although he painted it in at least two versions, the largest was destroyed by fire in 1893, and the second sat unknown in storage for decades. Since 1947, it has been in the White House collection.

Historical setting
In March 1865, General-in-Chief Ulysses S. Grant invited President Lincoln to visit his headquarters at City Point, Virginia. By coincidence, Major General William Tecumseh Sherman (then campaigning in North Carolina) happened to visit City Point at the same time.  This allowed for the war's only three-way meeting of President Lincoln, General Grant, and General Sherman.  Also present was Rear Admiral David Dixon Porter, who wrote about the meeting in his journal, and later recounted:

I shall never forget that council which met on board the River Queen. On the determinations adopted there depended peace, or a continuation of the war with its attendant horrors. That council has been illustrated in a fine painting by Mr. Healy, the artist, who, in casting about for the subject of an historical picture, hit upon this interview, which really was an occasion upon which depended whether or not the war would be continued a year longer. A single false step might have prolonged it indefinitely.

Painting

Studies
Healy painted several preparation studies, including studies for Lincoln, Grant, and Porter, which still survive in the collection of the Newberry Library in Chicago.

General Sherman's recollection
The artist was not present at the meeting near Richmond, which is the subject of the painting. However, he had previously painted individual portraits of the four men and from General Sherman, he had obtained information about the meeting.  In a November 28, 1872 letter to Isaac Newton Arnold, General Sherman wrote:

In Chicago about June or July of that year, when all the facts were fresh in my mind, I told them to George P. A. Healy, the artist, who was casting about for a subject for an historical painting, and he adopted this interview. Mr. Lincoln was then dead, but Healy had a portrait, which he himself had made at Springfield some five or six years before. With this portrait, some existing photographs, and the strong resemblance in form of [Leonard Swett], of Chicago, to Mr. Lincoln he made the picture of Mr. Lincoln seen in this group. For General Grant, Admiral Porter, and myself he had actual sittings, and I am satisfied the four portraits in this group of Healy's are the best extant. The original picture, life-size, is, I believe, now in Chicago, the property of Mr. [Ezra Butler McCagg]; but Healy afterwards, in Rome, painted ten smaller copies, about eighteen by twenty-four inches, one of which I now have, and it is now within view. I think the likeness of Mr. Lincoln by far the best of the many I have seen elsewhere, and those of General Grant, Admiral Porter, and myself equally good and faithful. I think Admiral Porter gave Healy a written description of our relative positions in that interview, also the dimensions, shape, and furniture of the cabin of the "Ocean Queen"; but the rainbow is Healy's—typical, of course, of the coming peace. In this picture I seem to be talking, the others attentively listening. Whether Healy made this combination from Admiral Porter's letter or not, I cannot say; but I thought that he caught the idea from what I told him had occurred when saying that "if Lee would only remain in Richmond till I could reach Burkesville, we would have him between our thumb and fingers," suiting the action to the word.  It matters little what Healy meant by his historic group, but it is certain that we four sat pretty much as represented, and were engaged in an important conversation during the forenoon of March 28, 1865, and that we parted never to meet again.

Fate of original painting
The large life size version of the painting was destroyed in the 1893 Calumet Club fire in Chicago.  The existing smaller version, also by Healy, was rediscovered in 1922, after lying unnoticed in a family storeroom in Chicago for fifty years.  The acquisition of the painting by the Truman White House in 1947 was laden with contemporary significance, for another great conflict, World War II, had ended just two years earlier.

Legacy

The pose of Lincoln inspired Healy's 1869 portrait, Abraham Lincoln. Robert Todd Lincoln considered the likeness of his father in this painting to be the "most excellent in existence."

The U.S. Postal Service commemorated the 200th anniversary of the birth of Abraham Lincoln by issuing four first-class commemorative 42-cent stamps.  One of these stamps features an image of this painting.

The painting was displayed in the Treaty Room of the White House from the Kennedy through the George W. Bush presidencies. In his book Decision Points, President Bush mentions the painting specifically and makes the following comment: "Before 9/11, I saw the scene as a fascinating moment in history. After the attack, it took a deeper meaning. The painting reminded me of Lincoln's clarity of purpose: he waged war for a necessary and noble cause."  It was briefly loaned to the George H. W. Bush Presidential Library from March 11, 2002 to July 31, 2002 for an exhibit entitled, "Fathers and Sons: Two Families, Four Presidents."  The painting is also featured behind the elder Bush in his official presidential portrait, painted by Herbert Abrams.

The Obama administration moved the painting to the private Oval Office dining room in the West Wing, where it currently hangs.  There is also a copy of the painting at the Pentagon.

See also
 Art in the White House
 Military leadership in the American Civil War
 End of the Civil War 1864-1865
 Carolinas Campaign
 Military art

References

External links
 White House Historical Association Summary
 Art Image Details

American Civil War in art
Abraham Lincoln in art
Cultural depictions of Ulysses S. Grant
1868 paintings
Art in the White House
Rainbows in art